Parbat District (is a hilly area of Nepal. It is a part of Gandaki Province and one of the seventy-seven districts of Nepal. It is the fourth smallest district of Nepal with 47 VDCs currently (before Kushma Municipality was formed, total VDCs remained 55.). 

It is mainly known for the Gupteshwar Cave, which is visited by thousands of pilgrims during Shivaratri. Patheshwari Temple a notable temple in Kushma located at Katuwa Chaupari of Kushma-09. Patheshwori Mandir has many sub-temples inside like Ram Janaki Mandir, Bhagwati, Devi, Hanuman, and others. Alapeshwar cave is a cave in this district. It is also noted for the Dahere Deurali Temple, which is visited by thousands of pilgrims during Bala Chaturdashi. Kamadhenu Mandir is another temple of Parbat district which is located in Khurkot development committee. Recently the Modi hydro project of 10 M.W. has been constructed in this district. Parbat's biggest playground lies in Phalewas village named Majhi Chour and Indra Chour.

Geography and climate
Parbat district has diversified geographical features. It extends from 280 00’ 19" N to 280 23’ 59" N latitude and 830 33’ 40" E to 830 49’ 30" E longitude

Demographics

At the time of the 2011 Nepal census, Parbat District had a population of 146,590. Of these, 91.7% spoke Nepali, 4.1% Magar, 3.0% Gurung, 0.6% Newari, 0.1% Bhojpuri, 0.1% Hindi, 0.1% Maithili, 0.1% Tamang and 0.1% other languages as their first language.

In terms of ethnicity/caste, 35.8% were Hill Brahmin, 17.3% Chhetri, 11.0% Magar, 9.2% Kami, 7.5% Damai/Dholi, 6.7% Sarki, 3.7% Gurung, 2.5% Thakuri, 2.4% Newar, 1.4% Sanyasi/Dasnami, 0.5% Gharti/Bhujel, 0.4% Musalman, 0.3% Kumal, 0.2% Majhi, 0.2% Tamang, 0.1% Bote, 0.1% Chhantyal, 0.1% Rai, 0.1% Thakali, 0.1% Tharu and 0.2% others.

In terms of religion, 89.5% were Hindu, 9.3% Buddhist, 0.5% Christian, 0.4% Muslim, 0.2% Bon and 0.1% others.

In terms of literacy, 73.8% could read and write, 2.3% could only read and 23.9% could neither read nor write.

Political division
Entire Parbat district which had earlier 55 VDCs is now divided into 2 municipalities and 5 rural municipalities (gaunpalika) as listed below:
 Kushma Municipality
Phalewas Municipality
Jaljala rural municipality 
Paiyun Rural Municipality
Mahashila Rural Municipality
Modi Rural Municipality
 Bihadi Rural Municipality

Village development committees (VDCs) and municipalities

Arthar Dadakharka
Bachchha
Bahaki Thanti
Bajung
Balakot
Banau
Baskharka
Behulibas
Bhangara
Bhoksing
Bhorle
Bhuk Deurali
Bhuktangle
Bihadi Barachaur
Bihadi Ranipani
Pipaltari
Chitre
Chuwa
Deupurkot
Deurali
Devisthan
Dhairing
Durlung
Hosrangdi
Huwas
Karkineta
Katuwa Chaupari
Khola Lakuri
Khurkot
Kurgha
Kushma Municipality
Kyang
Lekhphant
Limithana
Lunkhu Deurali
Mallaj Majhphant
Mudikuwa
Nagliwang
Pakhapani
Pakuwa
Pang
Pangrang
Phalamkhani
Phalebas Devisthan
Phalebas Khanigaun
Ramja Deurali
Saligram
Salija
Saraukhola 
Shankar Pokhari
Shivalaya
Taklak
Tanglekot
Thana Maulo
Thapathana
Thuli Pokhari
Tilahar
Tribeni
Urampokhara
Wahakithanti
7 Palika

See also
Zones of Nepal

References

External links
www.kushmaparbat.com(first web site about parbat kushma & parbateli)
parbatjilla.com

 
Gandaki Province
Districts of Nepal established in 1962